Kagelestan (also Romanized as Kāgelestān, Kākolestān, Kākelestān, and Kākestān; also known as Kākolestān-e ‘Olyā) is a village in Pishkuh-e Zalaqi Rural District, Besharat District, Aligudarz County, Lorestan Province, Iran. At the 2006 census, its population was 116, in 23 families.

References 

Towns and villages in Aligudarz County